Musa bukensis is a species of wild banana (genus Musa) from the Solomon Islands. It is placed in section Callimusa (now including the former section Australimusa), having a diploid chromosome number of 2n = 20.

References

bukensis
Plants described in 1976
Flora of the Solomon Islands (archipelago)